Forum is an unincorporated community in Madison County, Arkansas, United States. It is located at the intersection of Arkansas highways 23, 23W and 127 near Withrow Springs State Park.

References

Unincorporated communities in Madison County, Arkansas
Unincorporated communities in Arkansas